Eutrachelophis is a genus of snakes, known commonly as ivory-naped snakes, of the family Colubridae. The genus contains two species, which are native to South America.

Species
The following species are recognized as being valid.
Eutrachelophis bassleri  – Ecuador, Peru
Eutrachelophis papilio  – Brazil

Etymology
The specific name, bassleri, is in honor of Harvey Bassler (1883–1950), who was an American petroleum engineer and herpetologist.

References

Further reading
Myers CW, McDowell SB (2014). "New Taxa and Cryptic Species of Neotropical Snakes (Xenodontinae), with Commentary on Hemipenes as Generic and Specific Characters". Bulletin of the American Museum of Natural History (385): 1–112. (Eutrachelophis, new genus, pp. 6–8; E. bassleri, new species, pp. 8–14, Figures 1–3, 10).
Zaher H, Prudente ALC (2019). "The enigmatic Amazonian genus Eutrachelophis: morphological evidence and description of new taxa (Serpentes: Dipsadidae: Xenodontini)". Amphibia-Reptilia 41 (2): 215–231. (Eutrachelophis papilio, new species).

Eutrachelophis
Snake genera